Abdoulaye Sékou Camara (17 November 1985 – 27 July 2013), better known as Sékou Camara, was a Malian footballer. Nicknamed "McCarthy", Camara primarily played as a striker and as a centre forward. At the time of his death, he was a striker for Pelita Bandung Raya.

Death
Sékou Camara died of a sudden heart attack while training with his teammates on 27 July 2013 at the Siliwangi Stadium in Bandung, West Java, Indonesia, at the age of 27.

See also
List of association footballers who died while playing

References

External links

1985 births
2013 deaths
Malian footballers
Malian expatriate footballers
Malian expatriate sportspeople in Indonesia
Expatriate footballers in Indonesia
Expatriate soccer players in South Africa
Liga 1 (Indonesia) players
PSAP Sigli players
Persiwa Wamena players
Pelita Bandung Raya players
Santos F.C. (South Africa) players
Jomo Cosmos F.C. players
Association football players who died while playing
Sportspeople from Bamako
Association football forwards
Mali international footballers
Sport deaths in Indonesia
21st-century Malian people